Srabionov's house is a building in Rostov-on-Don built in the 1910s on the project of the architect A. H. Zakiyev. Initially the house belonged to S.D. Srabionov, in him the Petrograd hotel was placed. As of 1925 it was DOMHA hotel "Business yard". From 1940th years the hotel carried the name "Don". Now the building occupies the Fifteenth arbitration Court of Appeal. In 2009—2013 in the building capital repairs were made. Srabionov's house has the status of an object of cultural heritage of regional value.

Architecture 
Srabionov's house is located at the intersection of Temernitskaya Street and Gazetny Lane. The facades taking to the streets have symmetric composition. Angular parts of facades are allocated with raskrepovka with bay windows. Raskrepovki in the center of facades are topped with attics of an arch configuration. Angular raskrepovka are completed by the attics decorated with sockets, a flower ornament and curbstones with decorative vases and spheres. The large role in forming of an architectural and art appearance of facades is played by balconies, different in a form (semicircular and rectangular). Facades are decorated with a stucco molding and decorative plaster. The main entrance to the building is solved in the form of an arch and located from Gazetny Lane. It is decorated by a women's mask and high reliefs of chimeras.

References 

Tourist attractions in Rostov-on-Don
Buildings and structures in Rostov-on-Don
Cultural heritage monuments in Rostov-on-Don
Cultural heritage monuments of regional significance in Rostov Oblast